Bandwan Mahavidyalaya is a college at Bandwan in Purulia district. It offers undergraduate courses in arts. It is affiliated to Sidho Kanho Birsha University.

Departments

Arts
Bengali
English
History
Sanskrit
Santali

See also

References

External links
 
Sidho Kanho Birsha University
University Grants Commission
National Assessment and Accreditation Council

Colleges affiliated to Sidho Kanho Birsha University
Universities and colleges in Purulia district
Educational institutions established in 2010
2010 establishments in West Bengal